The Carver matrix can refer to:

CARVER matrix - a military based target acquisition system
Carver matrix seriation diagram named after Martin Carver which is designed to represent the time lapse in use of recognizable archaeological entities such as floors and pits.